Sir Josiah John Guest, 1st Baronet (2 February 1785 – 26 November 1852), known as John Josiah Guest, was a Welsh engineer, entrepreneur and politician.

Early life
Guest was born on 2 February 1785 in Dowlais, Merthyr Tydfil, Wales. He was the son of Thomas Guest (d. 1807), a partner in the Dowlais Iron Company, and Jemima Revel Phillips. Guest was educated at Bridgnorth Grammar School and Monmouth School.

Career
After attending school, he learned the trade of ironmaking in his father's foundry at the hands of the works manager, John Evans. Guest was renowned for his ability to roll a bar of steel or cut a tram of coal as well as any of his father's workmen. Upon his father's death in 1807, Guest inherited his father's share of the company and developed the business, becoming sole owner of the works in 1815. By the time of his death in 1852, the Dowlais Iron Company had become the largest producer of iron in the world.

Guest was elected in 1825 as Member of Parliament for Honiton, Devon, holding the seat until defeated by Sir George Warrender in 1831. In 1832, he became the first MP for Merthyr Tydfil, and in 1837, he launched the campaign to have the town incorporated.

In 1838, Guest was created a baronet, of Dowlais in the County of Glamorgan. After his death in 1852, Guest was succeeded by his eldest son, who was elevated to the peerage in 1880 as Baron Wimborne, of Canford Magna in the County of Dorset, on Disraeli's initiative.

Philanthropy
His public works included a school at Dowlais, designed by Sir Charles Barry. Guest was a Fellow of the Royal Society and a Member of the Institution of Civil Engineers. He was the first chairman of the Taff Vale Railway.

Freemasonry
In August 1840, Guest was appointed Master of Loyal Cambrian Lodge, No. 110 in Merthyr Tydfil.

Personal life

On 11 March 1817, Guest married Maria Rankin but their marriage was short lived, Maria dying just nine months later in January 1818. On 29 July 1833, he subsequently married Lady Charlotte Elizabeth Bertie (1812–1895), daughter of Albemarle Bertie, 9th Earl of Lindsey.

Together, they had five sons and five daughters, including:
 Charlotte Maria Guest (1834–1902), who married Richard Du Cane (d. 1904), brother of Edmund Frederick Du Cane.
 Ivor Bertie Guest (1835–1914), who married Lady Cornelia Henrietta Maria Spencer-Churchill (1847–1927), daughter of John Spencer-Churchill, 7th Duke of Marlborough
 Katharine Gwladys Guest (1837–1926), who married the Reverend Frederick Cecil Alderson (d. 1907), son of Sir Edward Hall Alderson
 Thomas Merthyr Guest (1838–1904), who married the writer Lady Theodora Grosvenor (1840–1924), daughter of Richard Grosvenor, 2nd Marquess of Westminster
 Montague John Guest (1839–1909), a Liberal politician, who never married.
 Augustus Frederick Guest (1840–1862), who died aged 21.
 Arthur Edward Guest (1841–1898), a Conservative politician, who married Adeline Mary Chapman (d. 1931)
 Mary Enid Evelyn Guest (1843–1912), who married Sir Austen Henry Layard (1817–1894).
 Constance Rhiannon Guest (1844–1916), who married Hon. Charles George Cornwallis Eliot (1839–1901), youngest son of Edward Eliot, 3rd Earl of St Germans
 Blanche Vere Guest (1847–1919), who married Edward Ponsonby, 8th Earl of Bessborough (1851–1920).

Guest died in 1852 and was buried in an iron coffin under a red granite slab in the local St John's Church, which had been built for him in 1827.

After his death, his widow married Charles Schreiber (1826–1884) in 1855. Schreiber was an academic who had been Ivor's tutor in 1852. He was known for being a fine arts collector and Conservative Party politician who sat in the House of Commons between 1865 and 1884.

Descendants

Among his many grandchildren were: Edward Ponsonby, the 8th Earl of Bessborough, Granville Eliot (1867–1942) and Montague Eliot (1870–1960), who became the 7th and 8th Earls of St Germans, respectively. There was also Frances Guest (1869–1957), known as Lady Chelmsford, who married Frederic Thesiger, 1st Viscount Chelmsford, who served as Viceroy of India, Ivor Churchill Guest (1873–1939), who became 1st Viscount Wimborne, Christian Henry Charles Guest (1874–1957), a Liberal Member of Parliament "MP", Frederick "Freddie" Edward Guest (1875–1937), another Liberal MP, and Oscar Montague Guest (1888–1958), who was both a Liberal, and later, a Conservative MP.

References
Notes

Sources
Obituaries:
Gentleman's Magazine, 2nd ser., 39 (1853), 91–2
The Times, 9 December 1852

Gillham, C. L. (1972) "The politics of Sir John Guest, 1825–1852", MA dissertation, University of Wales
John, A. V. (2004) "Guest, Sir (Josiah) John, first baronet (1785–1852)", Oxford Dictionary of National Biography, Oxford University Press, accessed 25 August 2007 .

External links
 

1785 births
1852 deaths
Whig (British political party) MPs for English constituencies
Whig (British political party) MPs for Welsh constituencies
Fellows of the Royal Society
Foundrymen
People from Dowlais
Welsh industrialists
Baronets in the Baronetage of the United Kingdom
People educated at Bridgnorth Endowed School
UK MPs 1820–1826
UK MPs 1826–1830
UK MPs 1830–1831
UK MPs 1832–1835
UK MPs 1835–1837
UK MPs 1837–1841
UK MPs 1841–1847
UK MPs 1847–1852
People educated at Monmouth School for Boys
John Josiah
Members of the Parliament of the United Kingdom for Honiton
19th-century Welsh businesspeople